The February 2019 North American winter storm was one of three powerful winter storms that affected the continent in early February. This storm, in particular, paralyzed travel in parts of the Midwest, Northeast as well as Eastern Canada.

Meteorological history
An area of low pressure from the Pacific made landfall and tracked towards the Northern Plains by February 11, 2019. Afterward, the storm affected the Great Lakes region and the Northeast before heading north into Atlantic Canada and eventually, moving out to sea.

Impacts

Northern Plains

Roads and windshields were coated with ice as a result of a period of freezing drizzle in the Kearney, Nebraska area.

Midwest

Several accidents were reported on the I-94 in Wisconsin. Certain highways in Eastern Iowa were left impassible February 12 (the day after the storm) due to a combination of fresh snowfall and strong winds, which resulted in blowing and drifting snow. Negaunee, Michigan received 26.5 inches (67 centimetres) of snowfall. Ice accretion in Northern Illinois and Northern Ohio downed power lines, leaving over 70,000 ComEd customers and some in Henry and Williams counties (Northwestern Ohio) without power.

Northeast

Significant ice accretion, more than a quarter-inch thick, occurred in West Virginia, Pennsylvania and Maryland, damaging trees and causing isolated power outages. Boston experienced their largest snowfall thus far this season, with 2.7 inches (6 centimetres). Over a foot of snow fell in Upstate New York, Northern Vermont, Northern New Hampshire and Western Maine.

Eastern Canada

With 35 centimeters (14 inches) of snow in the forecast for Southern Ontario and Southern Quebec, widespread school and business closures ensued. 70 km/h northwesterly winds following the storm brought lake effect snow squalls, further increasing snowfall totals. Residents complained of Toronto's snow removal operations.

See also

 January 2019 North American winter storm – another crippling winter storm that affected similar areas two weeks prior
 January–February 2019 North American cold wave – disruptive coldwave occurring simultaneously to the storm

References

2019 natural disasters in the United States
2018–19 North American winter
Storms
February 2019 events in the United States